The Kotahitanga movement was an autonomous Māori parliament convened annually in New Zealand from 1892 until 1902. Though not recognised by the New Zealand Government, the Māori Parliament was an influential body while it lasted. By 1902 its role was largely superseded by the Māori councils established by James Carroll and Hone Heke Ngapua through the Māori Councils Act 1900. As a result, Kotahitanga members unanimously voted for its dissolution at the 10th Parliament at Waiōmatatini in 1902.

Te Kotahitanga was distinct from Te Kauhanganui, the Māori parliament established by the Kingitanga movement in the late 1880s, because it called for the union of all Māori tribes, whereas Te Kauhanganui was convened by and for the hapu of the Waikato-Tainui region. In 1895 the two movements considered merging, but this ultimately failed.

Sessions

Waipatu 1892
The first formal session of Te Kotahitanga was held in June 1892 at Waipatu in Heretaunga. It was hosted by the former Member of Parliament for the Eastern Maori electorate, Henare Tomoana. 96 representatives sat in the Whare o Raro and 44 chiefs sat in the Whare Ariki. Tomoana was elected Speaker of the House because his tenure in parliament gave him the experience necessary to guide debates and maintain order. Hoani Te Whatahoro Jury was elected chairman, the formal head of the Whare o Raro, and Hamiora Mangakahia was elected premier, a position that made him the chief spokesperson for the movement.

Waipatu 1893
In 1893 the second session of Te Kotahitanga was also convened at Waipatu, though this session was poorly attended. Only 58 representatives sat in the Whare o Raro. At that time, Mangakahia had fallen out of favour with many of the movement's representatives and was not returned as premier. Hoani Te Whatahoro Jury was elected in his place.

Pakirikiri 1894
The 1894 session took place at Pakirikiri, near Gisborne. The session, hosted by local chief Otene Pitau, was well attended and lasted for over a month.

Rotorua 1895
The 1895 session of Te Kotahitanga was convened at Ohinemutu in Rotorua. Hamiora Mangakahia was re-elected for a second term as premier, and the role of speaker was given to Mohi Te Atahikoia of Ngāti Kahungunu. In the course of this session, Henare Tomoana accused Mangakahia of financial mismanagement of Te Kotahitanga during his first term as premier, and attempted to force his resignation. But Mangakahia was able to demonstrate in rebuttal that the mismanagement of Kotahitanga funds had actually developed during the term of his successor, Hoani Te Whatahoro Jury. The session is also notable as the setting for a potential merger of Te Kotahitanga with the Kingitanga movement. Mahuta Tāwhiao, the new King of the Waikato-Tainui tribes, was visited by representatives from the 1895 sitting of Te Kotahitanga, who invited him to sign the Kotahitanga deed of union, calling for the political union of all Māori tribes. Mahuta appointed a committee to consider the proposal, but was undermined by Waikato chief Tupu Atanatiu Taingakawa Te Waharoa, who circulated a rival deed of union calling for all Māori tribes to unite under the Kingitanga.

Membership 
The lower house, or Whare o Raro, had 96 members, elected at large from electorates defined according to tribal affiliation. The upper house, or Whare Ariki, was composed of 44 paramount chiefs elected by the members of the Whare o Raro. 127 representatives filled the 140 positions in both houses at the parliament's first sitting at Waipatu Marae in 1892, as 13 chiefs were elected to both houses.

Whare o Raro members (1892)

Whare Ariki Members (1892)

References

Māori history
Māori politics
1892 establishments in New Zealand
1902 disestablishments in New Zealand